Charles K. Barlowe is a professor of biochemistry at the Geisel School of Medicine at Dartmouth, where he studies mechanisms of intracellular transport of proteins and lipids. His focus is on the molecular mechanisms of protein and lipid trafficking that underlie intracellular transport and seeks to understand how proteins catalyze distinct sub-reactions in membrane traffic. Currently, his focus is on the mechanisms of protein transport between the endoplasmic reticulum and the Golgi complex. He uses yeast and animal cell models to study this process using biochemistry, molecular genetics, and microscopy.

Barlowe has been chairman of the Department of Biochemistry and Cell Biology since 2008.

Education 
 B.S., Chemistry College of William & Mary, 1983
 Ph.D., Biochemistry, University of Texas, Austin, 1990
 Postdoctoral Fellow, University of California, Berkeley, 1990–94

Honors and awards 
 Daman Runyon-Walter Winchell Cancer Fund Fellow 1990–93
 Pew Scholars Program in the Biomedical Sciences 1996–2000
 Merit Award, National Institutes of Health 2007
 American Association for the Advancement of Science Fellow 2010
 American Society for Microbiology Fellow 2012

References 

Geisel School of Medicine faculty
American biochemists
University of California, Berkeley alumni
University of Texas at Austin College of Natural Sciences alumni
College of William & Mary alumni
Living people
Year of birth missing (living people)
Place of birth missing (living people)